Duane Arthur Below (born November 15, 1985) is an American former professional baseball pitcher. He has played in Major League Baseball (MLB) for the Miami Marlins and Detroit Tigers. Below has also played in the KBO League for the Kia Tigers and in Nippon Professional Baseball (NPB) for the Yokohama DeNA BayStars.

Professional career

Major League Baseball

Detroit Tigers
Prior to playing professionally, Below attended Britton-Macon Area School District, in Britton, Michigan and Lake Michigan College. He was drafted by the Tigers in the 19th round of the 2006 amateur draft and began his professional career that year. He is the first player from Britton to be on a major league roster.

Below pitched for two teams in 2006, the GCL Tigers (15 games) and the Oneonta Tigers (two games). Overall, he went 2–0 with a 2.09 ERA in 17 games (six starts). In 2007, he pitched for the West Michigan Whitecaps, going 13–5 with a 2.97 ERA in 26 starts, striking out 160 batters in  innings. With the Lakeland Flying Tigers in 2008, he went 8–7 with a 4.46 ERA in 27 games (26 starts). He split 2009 between Lakeland (six games) and the Erie SeaWolves (two games), going 2–4 with a 2.70 ERA in eight starts overall. With Erie again in 2010, he went 7–12 with a 4.93 ERA in 28 starts.

Following the reassignment of Charlie Furbush from the Tigers to the Toledo Mud Hens, Below was called up to assume a starting vacancy. Below took the place on the active roster spot for Adam Wilk, while Casper Wells was reassigned to allow Furbush to return to the bullpen. Below made his major league debut against the Oakland Athletics on July 20, 2011, allowing one earned run in five innings. Below earned a no-decision in the game. Below went 0–2 in 14 games in 2011.

In 2012, Below was on the opening roster for the Tigers for the first time in his career, made available after an injury to Luis Marte. In his first two appearances of the season, Below earned wins in relief against the Boston Red Sox. On April 7, he won in relief of Doug Fister, who left the game early after a left-side strain. The next day, he earned a win after retiring one batter in the 11th inning.

The Tigers designated Below for assignment on April 24, 2013.

Miami Marlins
Below was claimed off waivers on April 25, 2013, by the Miami Marlins, who assigned him to Triple-A.

Second stint with the Tigers
Below signed a minor league deal to return to the Tigers on December 11, 2013.

Kia Tigers
Below signed with the Kia Tigers of the Korea Baseball Organization in August 2013.

New York Mets
On February 7, 2015, Below signed a Minor League deal with the New York Mets. Below spent the entire 2015 season with the Las Vegas 51s with a 4-3 record, 2.19 ERA and 1.10 WHIP with 28 strikeouts over 49.1 innings pitched. On December 14, 2015, Below signed back with the Mets.

Yokohama DeNA BayStars
Below signed with the Yokohama DeNA BayStars for the 2015 season.

Somerset Patriots
Below signed with the Somerset Patriots for the 2017 season. He re-signed for the 2018 and 2019 seasons.

Pitching style
Below's primary pitch is a four-seam fastball at 89–92 mph. He also throws a slider (85–88), a 12–6 curveball (78–82), a changeup (84–86). His repertoire against left-handed hitters is mostly fastball-slider-curveball, while against right-handers he substitutes the changeup for the curveball. His pitches have below-average whiff rates, and his K/9 rate is 5.1.

References

External links

Career statistics and player information from Korea Baseball Organization

Living people
1985 births
Baseball players from Michigan
People from Lenawee County, Michigan
Baseball pitchers
Detroit Tigers players
Miami Marlins players
Michigan State Spartans baseball players
Oneonta Tigers players
West Michigan Whitecaps players
Lakeland Flying Tigers players
Erie SeaWolves players
Gulf Coast Tigers players
Toledo Mud Hens players
New Orleans Zephyrs players
Kia Tigers players
Yokohama DeNA BayStars players
Las Vegas 51s players
American expatriate baseball players in South Korea
American expatriate baseball players in Japan
KBO League pitchers
Somerset Patriots players
Toros del Este players
American expatriate baseball players in the Dominican Republic
Gigantes del Cibao players